Kim Ju-seok (born 22 January 1954) is a South Korean boxer. He competed in the men's welterweight event at the 1976 Summer Olympics. At the 1976 Summer Olympics, he defeated Marcelino Garcia of the United States Virgin Islands, and then lost to Yoshioki Seki of Japan.

References

1954 births
Living people
South Korean male boxers
Olympic boxers of South Korea
Boxers at the 1976 Summer Olympics
Place of birth missing (living people)
Asian Games medalists in boxing
Boxers at the 1974 Asian Games
Asian Games gold medalists for South Korea
Medalists at the 1974 Asian Games
Welterweight boxers